Black Shark 5, Black Shark 5 Pro and Black Shark 5 RS are Android-based smartphone designed and manufactured by Xiaomi. These phones were announced on 30 March 2022.

References 

Android (operating system) devices
Mobile phones introduced in 2022
Xiaomi smartphones
Mobile phones with multiple rear cameras
Mobile phones with 4K video recording